Israel Reyes Romero (born 23 May 2000) is a Mexican professional footballer who plays as a centre-back for Liga MX club América.

International career
Reyes received his first call-up to the senior national team by Gerardo Martino, and made his debut on 8 December 2021 in a friendly match against Chile, coming in as a substitute in the 65th minute for Jordan Silva.

Career statistics

Club

International

International goals
Scores and results list Mexico's goal tally first.

References

External links
 
 
 

Living people
2000 births
Mexico international footballers
Association football defenders
Atlas F.C. footballers
Club Puebla players
Liga MX players
Footballers from Jalisco
Mexican footballers